The  was an infantry division of the Imperial Japanese Army. It was formed 2 April 1945 in Tokyo as a triangular division. It was one of the batch of eight divisions comprising 201st, 202nd, 205th, 206th, 209th, 212th, 214th and 216th divisions created as part of the Japanese reaction on the Battle of Okinawa.

Action
The 201st division was assigned to the second line of defenses of Kantō region deeper inland. The 501st infantry regiment was garrisoning Zama, 502nd and 503rd infantry regiments - Musashimurayama. Other sub-units were deployed at Gotemba. The 201st division did not see any combat.

See also
 List of Japanese Infantry Divisions

Notes and references
This article incorporates material from Japanese Wikipedia page 第201師団 (日本軍), accessed 14 July 2016
 Madej, W. Victor, Japanese Armed Forces Order of Battle, 1937–1945 [2 vols], Allentown, PA: 1981.

Japanese World War II divisions
Infantry divisions of Japan
Military units and formations established in 1945
Military units and formations disestablished in 1945
1945 establishments in Japan
1945 disestablishments in Japan